Claudia Joy Holden (née Meade) was a fictional character on the Lifetime television series Army Wives, portrayed by Kim Delaney.

Fictional biography
Claudia Joy was the daughter of Randall, a judge, and Shirley Meade. The Meades are implied to be from an upper-class New England background.

In Season 2, Shirley comes down to Fort Marshall at short notice. It emerged that Randall had a gambling and spending problem, to the point where Shirley even began to consider looking for a job to pay off the creditors. Shirley had attempted to highlight the problem but her husband was in denial of it. Despite Randall's repeated futile claims to have stopped Shirley decides to leave him and considered divorcing him. At dinner at the officer's club he offers to pay for dinner but instead left the tab in Michael's name. Claudia Joy, being her "father's daughter", refuses to believe her mother or Michael that her father had a problem. It was not until Randall asked Emmalin to borrow money from her college fund which he had started for her that Claudia Joy realized the seriousness of her father's addiction.

She was a political science major and studied law at Harvard University and, according to a former classmate, was an exceptional student. She later admitted that she studied law only because she was pressured into it due to her father's profession and never really enjoyed it during her college years despite her excellent grades. While in college she was known as "CJ" but since then she is usually addressed by her full name, even by her closest friends. During her third year she fell asleep at the wheel while driving home and fatally hit a pedestrian. She was charged with vehicular manslaughter and  received probation. She was asked to leave law school and did not receive her degree. Afterwards she met Michael Holden, who had recently graduated from West Point. They married and she never returned to complete her degree. When the show first premiered it is stated that they have been married for seventeen years. The couple have two daughters: Amanda Joy (born 1990) and Emmalin Jane (born 1992 or 1993). Amanda was killed in the Hump Bar bombing in the Season 1 finale.

The Holdens are close family friends of the Sherwoods; Claudia Joy and Denise are best friends, as are their children. They have known each other for many years through Michael and Frank, who were both concurrently stationed at Fort Carson and Fort Bliss.

Claudia Joy and Michael are the godparents of Joan and Roland Burton's daughter, Sara Elizabeth, and Denise and Frank Sherwood's daughter Molly.

In Season 3, Claudia Joy was diagnosed with diabetes. She initially had difficulty coming to terms with it and tried to hide her condition. After meeting a girl with the same condition at Emmalin's hockey practice she decides to tell the wives. After receiving her law degree and working at a law office (run by her former professor) she discovered that she had an ovarian tumor. Once removed it was revealed that the tumor was benign. Later, she was diagnosed with kidney failure brought on by her diabetes. While waiting for a kidney transplant, her best friend Denise finds out that she is a match and offers to donate a kidney to Claudia Joy in the episode "General Complications".

It was revealed at the beginning of Season 7 that Claudia Joy died of heart failure before the season started.

Characterization
Claudia Joy was often seen as the motherly figure by the other Army wives. She goes against social norm and quickly "adopts" Pamela and Roxy into "the tribe"; officers and enlisted personnel and their families generally did not mix around. For example, in the pilot, she let Pamela stay at her house to recover after giving birth despite the fact that Pamela was the wife of a sergeant.

Reception
The Chicago Tribune called Kim Delaney one of the best things about the show with Catherine Bell, who portrays Denise Sherwood while Rob Owen of the Pittsburgh Post-Gazette found Claudia Joy and Denise "the most passive, least interesting characters".

References

External links
 Claudia Joy Holden at Lifetime

Army Wives characters
Fictional Harvard University people
Fictional lawyers
Television characters introduced in 2007
American female characters in television